The Landers Center is an 8,400-seat multi-purpose arena in Southaven, Mississippi. It is home to the Memphis Hustle of the NBA G League, a minor league basketball team affiliated with the Memphis Grizzlies.

History 
The center was built in 2000. On January 4, 2012, Memphis-based Landers Auto Group purchased the naming rights. The name was changed to the Landers Center. Several now-defunct teams have called the arena home. These teams include the Memphis Xplorers of the AF2, the Memphis Houn'Dawgs of the American Basketball Association, and the Mississippi RiverKings (previously called the Memphis RiverKings) of the Central Hockey League and Southern Professional Hockey League.  Current sports tenants include the Memphis Hustle of the NBA G League and the new Memphis Americans of the new National Indoor Soccer League.

The center houses a 17,000 square foot convention center and 400 seat performing arts center. It is used as a concert venue, boxing arena, and for ice shows and circuses. Since 2009, the Mid-South Fair has been held at the Landers Center. Formerly, the fair was held in midtown Memphis at the Fairgrounds.

American recording artist Kelly Clarkson performed in the arena on February 9, 2019, during her Meaning of Life Tour to a sold-out crowd of over 7,000 patrons and grossed over $400,000. This was her first show in the state of Mississippi in over seven years since her Stronger Tour in 2012.

References

External links
Landers Center
Stadium Journey page

Sports venues in Mississippi
Buildings and structures in DeSoto County, Mississippi
Southaven, Mississippi
Basketball venues in Mississippi
Indoor ice hockey venues in the United States
Memphis Hustle
NBA G League venues
Sports in Southaven, Mississippi
Sports venues completed in 2000
2000 establishments in Mississippi